Waders or shorebirds are birds of the order Charadriiformes commonly found wading along shorelines and mudflats in order to forage for food crawling or burrowing in the mud and sand, usually small arthropods such as aquatic insects or crustaceans. The term "wader" is used in Europe, while "shorebird" is used in North America, where "wader" may be used instead to refer to long-legged wading birds such as storks and herons.

There are about 210 species of wader, most of which live in wetland or coastal environments. Many species of Arctic and temperate regions are strongly migratory, but tropical birds are often resident, or move only in response to rainfall patterns. Some of the Arctic species, such as the little stint, are amongst the longest distance migrants, spending the non-breeding season in the southern hemisphere.

Many of the smaller species found in coastal habitats, particularly but not exclusively the calidrids, are often named as "sandpipers", but this term does not have a strict meaning, since the upland sandpiper is a grassland species.

Taxonomy
In the Sibley-Ahlquist taxonomy, waders and many other groups are subsumed into a greatly enlarged order Ciconiiformes. However, the classification of the Charadriiformes is one of the weakest points of the Sibley-Ahlquist taxonomy, as DNA–DNA hybridization has turned out to be incapable of properly resolving the interrelationships of the group. Formerly, the waders were united in a single suborder Charadrii, but this has turned out to be a "wastebasket taxon", uniting no fewer than four charadriiform lineages in a paraphyletic assemblage. However, it indicated that the plains wanderer actually belonged into one of them. Following recent studies (Ericson et al., 2003; Paton et al., 2003; Thomas et al., 2004a, b; van Tuinen et al., 2004; Paton & Baker, 2006), the waders may be more accurately subdivided.

The waders are a group of two Charadriiformes suborders which include 13 families. Species in the third Charadriiforme suborder, Lari, are not considered as waders.

 Suborder Charadrii
 Family Burhinidae – stone-curlews, thick-knees (10 species)
 Family Pluvianellidae – Magellanic plover
 Family Chionidae – sheathbills (2 species) 
 Family Pluvianidae – Egyptian plover 
 Family Charadriidae – plovers (68 species) 
 Family Recurvirostridae – stilts, avocets (10 species) 
 Family Ibidorhynchidae – ibisbill 
 Family Haematopodidae – oystercatchers (12 species) 
 Suborder Scolopaci
 Family Rostratulidae – painted-snipes (3 species) 
 Family Jacanidae – jacanas (8 species) 
 Family Pedionomidae – plains-wanderer 
 Family Thinocoridae – seedsnipes (4 species) 
 Family Scolopacidae – sandpipers, snipes (98 species)
 Suborder Lari
 Family Turnicidae
 Family Dromadidae
 Family Glareolidae

Characteristics 
Shorebirds is a blanket term used to refer to multiple bird species that live in wet, coastal environments. Because most these species spend much of their time near bodies of water, many have long legs suitable for wading (hence the name ‘Waders’). Some species prefer locations with rocks or mud. Many shorebirds display migratory patterns and often migrate before breeding season. These behaviors explain the long wing lengths observed in species, and can also account for the efficient metabolisms that give the birds energy during long migrations.

The majority of species eat small invertebrates picked out of mud or exposed soil. Different lengths of bills enable different species to feed in the same habitat, particularly on the coast, without direct competition for food. Many waders have sensitive nerve endings at the end of their bills which enable them to detect prey items hidden in mud or soft soil. Some larger species, particularly those adapted to drier habitats will take larger prey including insects and small reptiles.

Sexual dimorphism 
Shorebirds, like many other animals, exhibit phenotypic differences between males and females, also known as sexual dimorphism. In shorebirds, various sexual dimorphisms are seen, including, but not limited to, size (e.g. body size, bill size), color, and agility. In polygynous species, where one male individual mates with multiple female partners over his lifetime, dimorphisms tend to be more diverse. In monogamous species, where male individuals mate with a single female partner, males typically do not have distinctive dimorphic characteristics such as colored feathers, but they still tend to be larger in size compared to females. The suborder Charadrii displays the widest range of sexual dimorphisms seen in the order Charadriiformes. However, cases of sexual monomorphism, where there are no distinguishing physical features besides external genitalia, are also seen in this order.

Sexual selection 
One of the biggest factors that leads to the development of sexual dimorphism in shorebirds is sexual selection. Males with ideal characteristics favored by females are more likely to reproduce and pass on their genetic information to their offspring better than the males who lack such characteristics. Mentioned earlier, male shorebirds are typically larger in size compared to their female counterparts. Competition between males tends to lead to sexual selection toward larger males and as a result, an increase in dimorphism. Bigger males tend to have greater access (and appeal) to female mates because their larger size aids them in defeating other competitors. Likewise, if the species exhibits gender role reversal (where males take on roles traditionally done by females such as childcare and feeding), then males will select female mates based on traits that are the most appealing. In the Jacana species, females compete with each other for access to male mates, so females are larger in size. Males choose female mates based on who presents herself as the strongest and who 'owns' the most territory.

Natural selection 
Another factor that leads to the development of dimorphisms in species is natural selection.  Natural selection focuses on traits and the environment's response to the traits in question; if the said trait increases the overall fitness of the individual possessing it, then it will be 'selected' and eventually become a permanent part of the population's gene pool. For example, depending on the food available in a shorebird specie's respective niche, bigger bill sizes may be favored in all individuals. This would essentially lead to monomorphism within the species but is subject to change once sexual selection acts on the trait. Sexual selection could give rise to males with relatively larger bills than females if males used their bills to compete with other males. If larger bill size assisted the male in gathering resources, it would also make him more attractive to female mates.

See also 
 Hybridisation in shorebirds
 List of Charadriiformes by population

References

Sources 

 Ericson, P. G. P.; Envall, I.; Irestedt, M.; & Norman, J. A. (2003). Inter-familial relationships of the shorebirds (Aves: Charadriiformes) based on nuclear DNA sequence data. BMC Evol. Biol. 3: 16.   PDF fulltext
Pandiyan, J. and S. Asokan. 2015. Habitat use of pattern of tidal mud and sandflats by shorebirds (charadriiformes) Wintering in southern India. Coastal Conservation https://doi.org/10.1007/s11852-015-0413-9.
 Paton, Tara A.; & Baker, Allan J. (2006). Sequences from 14 mitochondrial genes provide a well-supported phylogeny of the Charadriiform birds congruent with the nuclear RAG-1 tree. Molecular Phylogenetics and Evolution 39(3): 657–667.   (HTML abstract)
 Paton, T. A.; Baker, A. J.; Groth, J. G.; & Barrowclough, G. F. (2003). RAG-1 sequences resolve phylogenetic relationships within charadriiform birds. Molecular Phylogenetics and Evolution 29: 268–278.   (HTML abstract)
 Thomas, Gavin H.; Wills, Matthew A. & Székely, Tamás (2004a). Phylogeny of shorebirds, gulls, and alcids (Aves: Charadrii) from the cytochrome-b gene: parsimony, Bayesian inference, minimum evolution, and quartet puzzling. Molecular Phylogenetics and Evolution 30(3): 516–526.  (HTML abstract)
 Thomas, Gavin H.; Wills, Matthew A.; & Székely, Tamás (2004b). A supertree approach to shorebird phylogeny. BMC Evol. Biol. 4: 28.   PDF fulltext Supplementary Material
 van Tuinen, Marcel; Waterhouse, David; & Dyke, Gareth J. (2004). Avian molecular systematics on the rebound: a fresh look at modern shorebird phylogenetic relationships. Journal of Avian Biology 35(3): 191–194. PDF fulltext
 Explore the World With Shorebirds. (2004). U.S. Fish and Wildlife Service.  Web. http://digitalmedia.fws.gov/cdm/ref/collection/document/id/1598
 Lindenfors, P.; Szekely, T.; and Reynolds,  J. D. (2003). Directional Changes in Sexual Size Dimorphism in Shorebirds, Gulls and Alcids. Journal of Evolutionary Biology J Evolution Biol: 930–38. Print.
 Szekely, T.; Freckleton, R.; & Reynolds, J. (2004). Sexual selection explains Rensch's rule of size dimorphism in shorebirds. Proceedings of the National Academy of Sciences. 101(33): 12224–12227. 
 Szekely, Tamas; John D. Reynolds; and Jordi Figuerola. (2000) Sexual Size Dimorphism in Shorebirds, Gulls, and Alcids: The Influence of Sexual and Natural Selection. Evolution 54(4): 1404–413.

External links 
 

 
Bird common names